Air Service Gabon was an airline based in Libreville, Gabon. It was established in 1965 and operated scheduled flights and passenger and charter services in West Africa. Its main base was Libreville International Airport. The company announced that it ceased operation as of August 3, 2010.

The airline is on the List of air carriers banned in the European Union.

Destinations 
Air Service Gabon operated scheduled services to the following destinations (at March  2009):

Cameroon
Douala (Douala International Airport)
Gabon
Franceville (M'Vengue El Hadj Omar Bongo Ondimba International Airport)
Gamba (Gamba Airport)
Koulamoutou (Koula Moutou Airport)
Libreville (Libreville International Airport)
Makokou (Makokou Airport)
Mouila (Mouila Airport)
Oyem (Oyem Airport)
Port-Gentil (Port-Gentil International Airport)
Republic of the Congo
Brazzaville (Maya-Maya Airport)
Pointe-Noire (Pointe Noire Airport)
São Tomé and Príncipe
São Tomé (São Tomé International Airport)

Fleet

The Air Service Gabon fleet consisted of the following aircraft (as of 15 November 2009) :

4 Bombardier Dash 8-100
1 Bombardier Dash 8-300

As of 4 November 2008, the average age of the Air Service Gabon fleet is 12.3 years.

References

External links
Air Service Gabon
Air Service Gabon 
Air Service Gabon Fleet

Defunct airlines of Gabon
Airlines established in 1965
Airlines disestablished in 2010
Companies based in Libreville